Magdeburger FFC is a women's football club from Magdeburg. The club was founded in 1997 and won promotion to the 2. Fußball-Bundesliga in 2009.

History 
The club's roots lie with local sports club SG Handwerk Magdeburg. In the only official East German championship, the 1990-91 season, the team finished last. In 1991 the football department joined SV Fortuna Magdeburg, but in the next few years the team's performance was inconsistent. After a few mid-table results the team battled against relegation at the end of the 1990s. In 1997 the football department left the club again and created a new club, FSV Fortuna Magdeburg/Wolmirstedt. To further emphasize their independence from Fortuna Magdeburg, the club changed its name to Magdeburger FFC on 1 July 2003.

One year later, Magdeburg narrowly missed out on qualifying for the newly created 2nd Bundesliga, finishing 6th in the Regionalliga. In the DFB-Pokal the team reached the 2nd round for the first time in its history, losing 0–6 to Bundesliga side FFC Heike Rheine. As of July 2010, Magdeburg has qualified for the DFB-Pokal 14 times, twelve times by winning the Saxony-Anhalt Cup and twice by virtue of belonging to the 2nd Bundesliga.

In the next three years, 2005 through 2007, Magdeburg finished second in the Regionalliga . In the 2006-07 season, the club fought for the championship against 1. FC Union Berlin and SV Blau-Weiß Hohen Neuendorf, but as Magdeburg had not applied for a license for the 2nd Bundesliga, winning the championship would not have meant promotion. In 2009 the team finally finished first and was promoted to the 2. Fußball-Bundesliga Nord. In its first Bundesliga season they finished sixth.

The reserve team won promotion to the Regionalliga Nordost in the 2009-10 season, additionally the club sports several youth teams, ranging from an Under-11 squad to two Under-17 teams.

Honours 
 Regionalliga Nordost: 1
 Champions 2009
 Runners-up 2005, 2006, 2007
 Saxony-Anhalt Cup: 13 (Record)
 Winners 1992, 1993, 1995, 1996, 1997, 1998, 2000, 2003, 2004, 2005, 2007, 2008, 2009
 Saxony-Anhalt Indoor Championship: 5
 Winners 1998, 2000, 2002, 2004, 2007, 2008
 U17 NOFV Championship: 1
 Winners 2007

Past seasons

External links
 Official club site

Women's football clubs in Germany
Association football clubs established in 1997
Football clubs in Saxony-Anhalt
1997 establishments in Germany